Phauloppia banksi is a species of mite in the family Oribatulidae. Found in the United States, it was described as new to science in 1987. A study conducted in New York that showed that the mite is one of several that takes shelter in the thallus of the common North American lichen Punctelia rudecta.

References

Animals described in 1987
Arachnids of North America
Acari